I'm in Love with You is the third studio album by American vocal group the Detroit Emeralds, released in 1973 through Westbound Records.

Commercial performance
The album peaked at No. 27 on the R&B albums chart. It also reached No. 181 on the Billboard 200. The album features the single "You're Gettin' a Little Too Smart", which peaked at No. 10 on the Hot Soul Singles chart.

Track listing

Personnel
 David Krieger - art direction
 Joel Brodsky - photography
 Mia Krinsky - co-ordination
 Bob Scerbo - production supervision
 Abrim Tillmon - arrangement, songwriting
 James Mitchell - arrangement, songwriting, production (credited as Katouzzion)

Charts
Album

Singles

References

External links

1973 albums
The Detroit Emeralds albums
Westbound Records albums